The Burmese carplet (Amblypharyngodon atkinsonii), is a species of carplet in the family Cyprinidae. It is found in the Ayeyarwady, Sittaung, and lower Salween rivers in Myanmar.

References

Amblypharyngodon
Fish described in 1860
Taxa named by Edward Blyth